Nur Mohammad Kandi-ye Sofla (also Romanized as Nūr Moḩammad Kandī-ye Soflá; also known as Nūr Moḩammad Kandī) is a village in Aslan Duz Rural District, Aslan Duz District, Parsabad County, Ardabil Province, Iran. At the 2006 census, its population was 487, in 74 families.

References 

Towns and villages in Parsabad County